Bine FK was an Azerbaijani football club based in Baku.

History 
The club was founded in 1997 and participates in the Azerbaijan First Division.

Colours
The club colours are red and black.

Kit manufacturers
Bine's home kit is composed of red shirts, black shorts and socks. The club's kit manufacturer is Nike.

Stadium

Bine Stadium is a football stadium is a multi-use stadium in Bine settlement of Baku, Azerbaijan.  It is currently used as the club's home stadium and holds 600 people.

Honours 
 AFFA Amateur League
 Winners (1) : 2015–16

Managers
 Mehman Babayev (2016–2017)
 Ismayil Huseynov (2018)

References

External links 
 PFL
 Official Website

Football clubs in Azerbaijan
Association football clubs established in 1997
1997 establishments in Azerbaijan
Defunct football clubs in Azerbaijan
Association football clubs disestablished in 2018
2018 disestablishments in Azerbaijan